The 2010–11 Liga Indonesia Premier Division, also known as 2010–11 Liga Ti-Phone Indonesia season, was the sixteenth edition of Liga Indonesia Premier Division since its establishment in 1994. The competition ran from 19 November 2010 to 25 May 2011.

As in the previous seasons, there will be around 39 clubs, divided into three groups.

Participants

Relegated clubs from 2009–10 Indonesia Super League
Persik Kediri
Persebaya Surabaya1
Persitara North Jakarta

Promoted clubs from First Division
PSCS Cilacap
Persekam Metro FC
Bengkulu City FC
PSLS Lhokseumawe
Perseru Serui
Persemalra Maluku Tenggara
Barito Putra
Persikubar Kutai Barat2

2010–11 season clubs

Gresik United
PSAP Sigli
PSIM Yogyakarta
PSMS Medan
PS Mojokerto Putra
Persidafon Jayapura
Persikab Kabupaten Bandung
Persiku Kudus
Persiraja Banda Aceh
Mitra Kukar
PSBI Blitar
PSIR Rembang
PSS Sleman
Perseman Manokwari
Persigo Gorontalo
Persikabo Bogor
Persipasi Bekasi
Persita Tangerang
PPSM Sakti Magelang
PSDS Deli Serdang3
PSIS Semarang
PSSB Bireuen
Persiba Bantul
Persih Tembilahan
Persikota Tangerang
Persipro Probolinggo
Pro Titan Football Club

Lose in play-off promotion/relegation 2010
Persiram Raja Ampat

1= Persebaya Surabaya decided out of the competition held by PSSI that led to the membership Persebaya suspended. Then, they chose to join with Liga Primer Indonesia.

2= League Board decided Persires Rengat to replace Persikubar West Kutai as a participant in the premiere division because of financial problem in Persikubar. Later, it was revealed that Persikubar has been sold to Surabaya, to kept them in the competition. 

3= PSDS Deli Serdang resigned because of financial problems and replaced by Persis Solo.

Foreign Players

West

Central

East

These players do not fill a Visa position:
1Those players who were born and started their professional career abroad but have since gained Indonesia Residency;
2Foreign residents or foreign residents of Indonesian descent who have chosen to represent Indonesian national team;
3Players with Indonesian descent who were born and started their professional career abroad, but will have since gained Indonesia Residency;
4Those players who were born and started their professional career abroad, but will have since gained Indonesia Residency;
5Injured replacement players;

First round

Play on 19 November 2010 to 30 April 2011.

Group 1

Group 2

Group 3

Ranking of third placed teams

Second round

Group A 
 5 matches were played in Mandala Stadium, Jayapura, Papua.
 1 match were played in Barnabas Youwe Stadium, Sentani, Jayapura Regency, Papua.
 All times are Eastern Indonesia Time (WIT) – UTC+09:00.

Group B 
 5 matches were played in Madya Kudunga Tenggarong Stadium, Kutai Kartanegara, East Kalimantan.
 1 match were played in Segiri Samarinda Stadium, Samarinda, East Kalimantan.
 All times are Central Indonesia Time (WITA) – UTC+08:00.

Knockout phase 
The knockout phase is scheduled on 22 & 25 May 2011.

Semifinals

Third place

Final

NB:
(C) = Champion; (P) = Promoted.

Champions

Promotion/relegation play-off 

NB:
(O) = Play-off winner; (P) = Promoted to Indonesia Super League; (R) = Relegated to Indonesian Premier Division.

Top goal scorers
Including matches played on 13 March 2011

Note: players in bold are still active in the competition.

References

 
Second tier Indonesian football league seasons
Indonesian Premier Division seasons
2010–11 in Indonesian football leagues
Indonesia